Shatterford is a village in the Wyre Forest District of Worcestershire, England, located north-west of Bewdley and lies less than a mile from the county border with Shropshire.

The Bewdley School and Sixth Form Centre provides secondary education for pupils from the area. The village hall always has local events taking place from charity fundraising to the Shatterford show.

Robert Plant, the lead singer and frontman of rock band Led Zeppelin, lives nearby.

Villages in Worcestershire